Wes Watkins Reservoir is a reservoir located in Pottawatomie County in central Oklahoma, United States, between Oklahoma City and Shawnee (in the center of McLoud).  Its primary use is recreation, especially camping and fishing.

Wes Watkins Reservoir was opened to the public in August 1999 and is considered a relatively young reservoir.  The  lake is operated by the City of McLoud as of July 1, 2010. It was formerly managed by Pottawatomie County Development Authority.

The reservoir was named in honor of former Oklahoma Congressman Wes Watkins. It was initially known as North Deer Creek Lake.

The Shawnee city commissioners approved the transfer of Wes Watkins Reservoir recreational operations and management to the city of McLoud, beginning July 1, 2010.

Its drainage area is 38.5 square miles.

See also
 List of lakes in Oklahoma

References

External links
 Wes Watkins Reservoir as described at OutdoorsOK.com
 Wes Watkins Reservoir as described by the Oklahoma Department of Wildlife Conservation
 
 

Reservoirs in Oklahoma
Protected areas of Pottawatomie County, Oklahoma
Infrastructure completed in 1999
Bodies of water of Pottawatomie County, Oklahoma
1999 establishments in Oklahoma